Owasco Lake  is the sixth largest and third easternmost of the Finger Lakes of New York in the United States.

History
Owasco Lake's name may have been derived from the Iroquois word dwas-co, meaning bridge on the water. The name may also have been derived from the word was-co, meaning floating bridge. Cayuga territory was found between the territory of the Onondaga and Seneca. Jesuits founded missions among the Cayuga in the mid-17th century. In 1660, there were approximately 1,500 Cayuga.

In the nineteenth century, Owasco Lake was a popular vacation spot for the well-to-do. A casino located just north of Cascade hosted guests traveling by rail along the western length of the lake. Vestiges of the railway remain in the swampy waters, but the casino burned down in the early years of the twentieth century. The "indianist" composer Arthur Farwell camped on the east shore in 1899, before assuming his teaching duties at Cornell University, and wrote a set of piano pieces depicting his experience, entitled "Owasco Memories." He included a representation of "The Casino Across the Lake."

Description

The city of Auburn is located at the northern end and takes its drinking water from the lake. The lake lies entirely within the boundaries of Cayuga County, and the watershed boundary includes portions of Onondaga County and Tompkins County. Located at the south end of the lake is the hamlet of Cascade, which consists of a community of cottages, a marina, and a restaurant.

Owasco has the largest catchment area, or watershed, of all the Finger Lakes. This means that the land use has a large impact on water quality, and the lake especially vulnerable to nutrient loading from stormwater run-off. It is also downstream from the villages of Moravia and Groton. Sewage treatment effluent from two communities flows into the lake, which is regulated and permitted by the NYS Department of Environmental Conservation.

Owasco Lake and Skaneateles Lake are the only Finger Lakes that have rules and regulations to conserve water quality. The Owasco Lake Watershed Inspection and Protection Division (OLWIPD) enforces the 1984 Owasco Lake Watershed Rules and Regulations and inspects various types of land use to determine compliance. Owasco Lake is in the process of updating their rules and regulations which will provide protections comparable to Skaneateles Lake if passed.

Recreation

Owasco Lake is an excellent recreation spot. Because it is smaller and shallower than many other Finger Lakes, its waters warm up much more quickly, so swimming, water-skiing, and boating are popular. At the lake's northern end is Emerson Park, a county park featuring a beach and boat launch. The lake's northeastern corner is home to the private Owasco Yacht Club, founded in 1889.

Fishing
Fish species present in the lake include lake trout, brown trout, rainbow trout, landlocked salmon, largemouth bass, smallmouth bass, northern pike, yellow perch, bluegill, pumpkinseed sunfish, rock bass, black bullhead, pickerel, and walleye. There is access via county owned hard surface boat launch in the park on the north shore for a fee.

References

 Dave Tobin. "A Watertight Watershed." Post-Standard, December 24, 2006
 Pritzker, Barry M. A Native American Encyclopedia: History, Culture, and Peoples, Oxford: Oxford University Press, 2000. .

External links
 Map of Owasco Lake Points of Interest
 Emerson Park
 Owasco Yacht Club
 Owasco Watershed Lake Association
 Near-Real-Time Water Quality Data

Finger Lakes
Lakes of Cayuga County, New York
Tourist attractions in Cayuga County, New York
Lakes of New York (state)